Jasia Akhtar (born 27 May 1988) is an Indian cricketer who currently plays for Rajasthan. She play as a right-handed batter. She previously played for Punjab and Trailblazers.

In September 2017, Akhtar was called up to a national camp for the India women's national cricket team, becoming the first woman cricketer from Jammu and Kashmir to be selected for a national camp.

References

External links
 
 

Living people
1988 births
People from Shopian district
Cricketers from Jammu and Kashmir
Indian women cricketers
Punjab, India women cricketers
Rajasthan women cricketers
IPL Trailblazers cricketers
Delhi Capitals (WPL) cricketers